Passiflora morifolia, the blue sweet calabash or woodland passionflower, is a white and purple flowered passion flower with blue or purple fruit.  The very fast-growing vine that can grow a few dozen feet in a season. Flowers are ornate, white, blue and purple fruits follow, which ripen to blue or purple. The orange pulp might be edible.  The hardiness of P. morifolia is to at least 32 °F, some sources claim as low as 15-20 °F. It grows well in full sun or filtered sun. The vine is fast growing and once established it is quite vigorous. Its propagation is by seed or by cuttings. It is grown as an ornamental.  It is not cultivated for its fruit. It is native to the parts of Central and South America.

References

morifolia